Negrilești is a commune in Bistrița-Năsăud County, Transylvania, Romania. It is composed of three villages: Breaza (Emberfő), Negrilești and Purcărete (Porkerec). These belonged to Ciceu-Giurgești Commune until 2002, when they were split off.

Natives
Mihály Dávid

References

Communes in Bistrița-Năsăud County
Localities in Transylvania